Broadrick Secondary School (BSS) is a co-educational government secondary school located along Old Airport Road, Singapore. The school is located beside Dakota MRT station.

History
Broadrick Secondary School was first established in 1968 at Dunman Road as an integrated school with both English and Chinese streams. 

The school was officially opened by Mr Joseph Francis Conceicao, the then Member of Parliament for Katong, on 14 March 1969. 

The school later moved to its current location at 61 Dakota Crescent in 2005 and was officially opened by Dr Yaacob Ibrahim on 20 July 2007.  

Broadrick Secondary School celebrated her 45th Anniversary on 24 April 2015 which was graced by Minister for Communications and Information and Minister–in-charge of Muslim Affairs, Dr Yaacob Ibrahim, an alumnus.

Merger
In 1996, Broadrick Secondary School merged with Maju Secondary School to become a single session school. 

Secondary Three and Secondary Four students from Broadrick Secondary School, used to attend technical classes at the Maju Secondary School when both school are situated side by side in the early days.

In 2011, Broadrick merged with Telok Kurau Secondary School.

In 2017, Broadrick merged with MacPherson Secondary School.

The Ministry of Education (MOE) release statement on 4 March 2016 that amid falling student cohort sizes, 22 secondary schools — including some household names — will be merged into 11 by 2018. 

Shrinking birth rates in Singapore over the past two decades have led to a corresponding decline in overall demand for school places and a “significant excess” of secondary school places at the national level. Therefore Broadrick and MacPherson Secondary School merged.

Awards and achievements

CCA

Performing Arts 
Modern Dance
 Singapore Youth Festival 2017 Certificate of Distinction
 Super24 Competition @ Tampines Hub Certificate of Participation
English Drama –  Singapore Youth Festival 2017 Certificate of Distinction 
Show Choir – B-dazzled Competition @ RWS Platinum AwardBest Costume
Concert Band – Singapore Youth Festival 2017 Certificate of Distinction

Uniformed Groups 
NPCC – Best Community Safety and Security Programme 2017 18th Placing
Red Cross Youth – First Aid Championships (2017) Junior-Gold, Senior-Silver
Girl Guide – 
NCC 
 Kindness Badge Movement 2017 Bronze (Sec 1 and Sec 2 only) 
 Total Defence Sec 1: Bronze (16 students),Sec 2: Silver (8 students),Sec 3: Gold (11 students)
 NCC Sports and Games (East Zone) Frisbee Competition 2017 NCC Sports and Games (East Zone) Frisbee Competition 2017

Clubs and Societies 
Environment Club - Love Your Food @ Schools Project 2017 Certificate of Participation
Robotics Club
 VEX Robotics Competition 2017 @ Rulang Pri 3rd placing Judges Award 
 Autonomous Challenge 2017 @ VJC 	Most Efficient Robot
AV (Photography) club - The Media Challenge 2017 @ Republic Polytechnic Certificate of Participation

Sports 
Taekwondo

Notable alumni
 Inderjit Singh: Former Member of Parliament
 Justin Quek: first Asian chef invited to participate in Lufthansa's Star Chefs program
 Natalie Hennedige: Artistic director, Cake Theatrical Productions

References 

Secondary schools in Singapore